An Out Growth (OG) is an urban settlement contiguous to another urban area like Statutory towns, Census towns or a City. Though it possess all the urban characteristics, it is not qualified as an independent town. It should not possess any uninhabited areas and strictly be a contiguous to the town.

As per 2011 Census of India, it is defined as:

"A viable unit such as a village or part of a village contiguous to a statutory town and possess the urban features in terms of infrastructure and amenities such as pucca roads, electricity, taps, drainage system, educational institutions, post offices, medical facilities, banks etc. Examples of OGs are Railway colonies, university colonies and port areas, that may come up near a city or statutory towns outside its statutory limits but within the revenue limit of a village or villages contiguous to the town or city."

See also 

Urban agglomeration
Urban sprawl

External links 
Census of India

References 

Urban studies and planning terminology
Urban geography
Economic geography
Population
Types of populated places